() was a televised song contest held as a qualifying round for the Eurovision Song Contest 1993.

The contest was organised with the purpose of reducing the number of competing countries in the Eurovision Song Contest as a result of increased interest in participation among countries following the fall of communist regimes in Europe and the formation of new countries due to the breakup of Yugoslavia and dissolution of the Soviet Union. Three places in the 1993 Eurovision Song Contest, held on 15 May in Millstreet, Ireland, were provided for countries which had never taken part before, and seven countries ultimately sent entries to be performed and voted on in the televised contest in Slovenia.

A relegation system was introduced to the Eurovision Song Contest, which allowed new countries direct access to the contest in future editions to replace the lowest-scoring countries from the previous year's event.

Background 
The Eurovision Song Contest is an internationally televised songwriting competition organised annually by the European Broadcasting Union (EBU) and featuring participants representing primarily European countries. Each participating country submits an original song to be performed by a chosen artist, with competing countries then casting votes for the other countries' songs to determine a winner.

By 1992 an increasing number of countries had begun expressing an interest in participating in the contest for the first time; this increase in interest was the result of many new countries being formed following the breakup of Yugoslavia and dissolution of the Soviet Union and as part of revolutions leading to the fall of communist regimes in Europe and across the world which took place in the late 1980s and early 1990s.

In order to determine which countries would progress to the contest proper, a preselection round was held for the first time in the contest's history, with the top three countries in this round progressing to compete in the Eurovision Song Contest 1993 held in Millstreet, Ireland. This contest, took place in Ljubljana, Slovenia and was produced by the Slovenian public broadcaster  (RTV SLO).

Participating countries 
Subsequently Bulgaria's planned entry did not materialise, however  and  joined the contest, resulting in seven countries competing in total for the three spots available in Millstreet.

Conductors 
A separate musical director could be nominated by each country to conduct the orchestra during their performance. The conductors listed below led the orchestra during the performance for the indicated countries.

 
 
 Peeter Lilje
 
 George Natsis
 Petar Ugrin
 Vladimir Valovič

Participants and results 

 took place on 3 April 1993. The table below outlines the participating countries, the order in which they performed, the competing artists and songs, and the results of the voting.

The three countries which received the most votes once all countries had voted, and thus progressed to the Eurovision Song Contest 1993, were Slovenia, Bosnia and Herzegovina and Croatia. Estonia, Hungary, Romania and Slovakia, which failed to progress through , made their contest debuts , following the introduction of a relegation system for the 1994 contest which resulted in the seven lowest-scoring countries from the 1993 contest losing the right to participate in the following year's event to make room for new countries.

Detailed voting results 

Jury voting was used to determine the points awarded by all countries. As telephone communications could not be relied upon to reach juries based in the competing countries, one juror from each country was sent to Slovenia in order to provide votes for their respective country. These jurors was based in the studio and announced their votes live and on camera during the voting segment. Each juror awarded twelve points to their favourite entry, followed by ten points to their second favourite, and then awarded points in decreasing value from eight to five for the remaining songs, excluding the entry from their own country. The respective jurors from each country and the detailed breakdown of the points awarded is listed in the tables below.

Jurors

  – 
  – Ksenija Urličić
  – 
  – 
  – Aurora Andronache
  – Mojmir Sepe
  – Stanislav Bartovič

Broadcasts 

The contest was broadcast via the EBU's Eurovision network, with EBU member broadcasters able to relay the contest via their broadcast channels. Broadcasters were able to send commentators to provide coverage of the contest in their own native language and to relay information about the artists and songs to their television viewers. Known details on the broadcasts in each country, including the specific broadcasting stations and commentators are shown in the tables below.

Notes and references

Notes

References

Bibliography 
 
 

Eurovision Song Contest 1993
1993 in Slovenia
April 1993 events in Europe